The Escuela de Educación Técnica Nº7 (EET Nº7), (also called IMPA), is a high school institution in  Quilmes City, Buenos Aires, Argentina. It is directly administered by the Dirección General de Escuelas y Educación and the Argentine Air Force and located in the Area Material Quilmes.

IMPA

Before the Area Material Quilmes was established in the place where now there was not an industrial facility called "IMPA" which was short for "Plastic Metalworkers Argentinas". When the school was founded in 1957, there was a tower within Quilmes, which had the IMPA logo painted on it; this tower is visible from the Avenue Otamendi. Then the tower was painted, although the slogan IMPA remained visible from despite painting. Finally the front of the tower was cut off and removed the IMPA slogan for this school and it earned the nickname "IMPA", in reference to that company. Later, the school adopted the theme and the fact that his motto in the Spanish acronym "Progress Action Master Identity".

History of the college

The school began operations in March 1957, first under the jurisdiction of the Regional Workshop Quilmes. The school's mission was to educate apprentices for the workshops of aircraft operators. On April 25, 1962, Quilmes Regional Workshop and the National Council of Technical Education agreed and the school officially began operating as a secondary school under the name of the  National Technical Education School No. 4 "Taller de Quilmes regional" using the facilities and assets provided by the Argentinian Air Force. Since 1971, the electronics technician degree has been offered at the  school, and it graduated its first class of electronics technicians in 1973. The title of Technical Aviation has offered since 1973, and it graduated its  first class of aeronautical technicians in 1975. After the 1999 reforms of secondary schools in Buenos Aires, the electronics technician degree was replaced by the qualification of avionics technician. The school was renamed the School of Technical Education No. 7 "Taller Regional Quilmes"

Academic life

Classes begin at 7:35 and end at 15:30 (basic cycle) with a second class finishing at 17:40.

To become a student at this institution, one must take an entrance exam which is evaluated (by the year to which they will be entering). Mathematics is a necessary qualification. In the fourth year there is specialisation between Aeronautical and Avionics.

Years of study

 1st year: basic cycle unskilled
 2nd year: without basic cycle expertise
 3rd year: without basic cycle expertise
 4th year: Aviation Avionics-cycle or higher
 5th year: what is chosen in 4th year - cycle higher
 6th year: what is chosen in 4th year - cycle higher
 7th year: what is chosen in 4th year - cycle higher

Academics 
Classes begin at 7:30 in the morning, ending at 5:40 in the afternoon (high school).
Classes begin at 7:30 in the morning, ending at 3:40 in the afternoon (middle school).

Students enter the school in first year in the 3rd EGB cycle (7th, 8th and 9th grade). If this is completed, students begin the Polimodal (10th, 11th and 12th grade); if this is completed, the student receives the bachelor diploma. If the student decides to do so, he can enter the technician year; if completed, the student receives the technician degree.

Facilities 
The school has a hangar with seven planes and two helicopters, along with motors, landing gear, etc. There is an avionics laboratory, pneumatics lab, hydraulics lab and digital electronics lab.

The school has a dining room and a cafeteria.

The school has a rugby and soccer field, together with a shot put field, javelin throw field, long jump field, high jump equipment, and a running track.

Regulations 
 To pass a test, students need 7 out of 10 points (usually in the rest of the country, students need 6 out of 10 points).
 Students can only have 15 banns (usually in the rest of the country, they can have 25).

School administration
The day-to-day administration of the school is headed by the principal, Prof. Jorge Pablo Juares. There is also a symbolic headmaster, who is an officer in the Argentinian Air Force, Comodoro Roberto E. Olgiati.

School Principaps since the accreditation from the Consejo Nacional de Educación Técnica (April 25, 1962):
 25 April 1962 to 22 August 1969: Prof. Agustín Mario Jatib
 28 August 1969 to 10 March 1986: Ambrioso Enrique Pariani
 10 March 1986 to 19 April 1990: Cesar Santiago Valentini
 19 April 1990 to 2014: Prof. Hugo Cesar Jorge Alori
 27 September 2014 to present: Prof. Jorge Pablo Juares

See also 
Argentinean Air Force
Secondary Schools in Argentin
IMPA Tu-Sa

External links 
  
 Official graduate students website

Education in Buenos Aires
Secondary schools in Argentina
Educational institutions established in 1957
1957 establishments in Argentina